Heringomyia is a genus of tephritid  or fruit flies in the family Tephritidae.

Species
Heringomyia albipilosa (Hering, 1940)
Heringomyia fordianum (Munro, 1935)
Heringomyia zernyana (Hering, 1941)

References

Tephritinae
Tephritidae genera
Diptera of Africa